Johannes Bosschaert (1606/08– 1628/29) was a member of the Bosschaert family of still life painters.

Biography
He was born in Middelburg, one of the three sons of Ambrosius Bosschaert, who painted flowers in a similar style. His brothers Ambrosius and Abraham also became flower painters. He moved with his family and uncle Balthasar van der Ast to Bergen op Zoom in 1615, and moved with them again in 1619 to Utrecht, but after his father died in 1621, Johannes became a member of the Haarlem Guild of St. Luke in 1623 and paid membership until 1625. In 1626 he moved south again and became a member of the Dordrecht Guild of St. Luke. He influenced his younger brother Abraham and the Dordrecht painter Jacob Gerritsz Cuyp. Like his father and brothers, he signed his works with a monogram; JB. He died in Dordrecht; the precise date of his death is unknown.

References

 
Johannes Bosschaert on Artnet

1600s births
1620s deaths
Dutch Golden Age painters
Dutch male painters
Dutch still life painters
Flower artists
Painters from Haarlem
Painters from Dordrecht
Painters from Middelburg
Year of death unknown